Nahid Biyarjomandi (born April 12, 1988 in Karaj) is an Iranian rugby coach. She was chosen as one of 15 Unstoppable women in rugby. In 2016, she was appointed by the Iran Rugby Federation as head of its development committee, overseeing both women’s and men’s participation, and currently sits on the union’s board.

Life 
Nahid Biyarjomandi was born on April 12, 1988 in Karaj.

work 
She is coach of the Iranian women's national rugby team. Biyarjomandi founded the first women’s rugby club in Iran and her involvement in World Rugby’s global ‘Try And Stop Us’ campaign has had a positive impact in her homeland.

She is one of the Asia Rugby Exco members and the chairperson of the Gender Equity committee, and also the board member and Head of Development Committee of Iran Rugby.

Achievement 
 2021 World Rugby Women’s Executive Leadership Scholarship recipients

References

External links 

 
 
 Nahid Biarjamandi The pride of Iranian women in world rugby

Iranian female rugby
1988 births
Living people
People from Alborz Province